Robert MacDonald (1813–1893) was a Scottish minister of the Free Church of Scotland who served as Moderator of the General Assembly in 1882/83.

Life

He was born in Perth on 18 May 1813, the son  of  Alexander  MacDonald, wine merchant, and Charlotte  Macfarlane. and educated at Perth Academy. He studied Divinity at St Andrews University and Divinity Hall in Edinburgh studying under David Welsh and Thomas Chalmers.

He filled a vacant post at Logiealmond in 1836 but without ordination. He was ordained by the Church of Scotland at Blairgowrie on 15 June 1837. His patron was Mr Oliphant of Gask (Scott has "Mrs Oliphant of Gask and Ardblair in February"). He left the established church in the Disruption of 1843. Together with a group of other ministers from Central Scotland including Robert McCheyne and Andrew Bonar, they conceived the idea of the Free Church "like a torch of fire in a sheaf". This symbol was widely adopted by the Free Church. It is often mistaken for a burning bush as described in the Bible story in Exodus.

Along with Rev Thomas Chalmers he was one of the main figures in organising the building of New College on the Mound in Edinburgh. His other main work for the Free Church was the establishment of the Non-Conformist School System across all Scotland, which in turn paved the way for the Education (Scotland) Act 1872. From 1843 he organised the 300 parish teachers, formerly paid by the Church of Scotland, who had left to join the Free Church. The first year was financially very difficult. MacDonald set to raise £50,000 to cover the needed costs. In the assembly of 1844 he announced that he had secured subscriptions of £52,000 therefore fully meeting his objectives.

He was translated to North Leith Free Church on Ferry Road in Edinburgh in 1857. He lived nearby at 2 Jamaica Street now called Summerside Place. The congregation increased from 450 to 1100 under his ministry. St Andrews University awarded him an honorary doctorate (DD) in 1870.

He retired in 1879 and went to lived at 11 Gloucester Place in Stockbridge, Edinburgh. His ministry at North Leith was taken over by the Rev Thomas Crerar.

In 1882 he succeeded Rev William Laughton as Moderator of the General Assembly, the highest position in the Free Church of Scotland. He was succeeded in turn in 1885 by Rev Horatius Bonar.

He died in Edinburgh on 21 August 1893. He is buried in Warriston Cemetery in north Edinburgh. The grave lies on the south side of the central roundel.

MacDonald's North Leith Free Church at 74 Ferry Road was demolished in 1983 to make way for a care home. However, the "Burning Sheaf" stone, bearing the date 1843, was salvaged and now stands in the church hall of North Leith Church (Church of Scotland) nearby on Madeira Street.

Family

He was married to Catherine Malcolm (1810-1885). Robert McCheyne, is noted as his "groomsman", what is now called best man at their wedding. They had at least two daughters.

He  married  4  June 1840,  Catherine  Malcolm,  who  died  18 February  1880,  aged  75,  and  had  issue —
Jessy Dingwall Fordyce  (married  1866,  Sir  Thomas Grainger Stewart,  M.D.,  LL.D.,  Edinburgh), died  10  June  1921
Charlotte Jane  (married  Robert  Macdonald,  S.S.C., Edinburgh)
and  others.

Publications

A Word  to  Everyone :  being  the  Message-bearer  ;  A  Dark  Night  at  Hand  (Dundee, 1843)
Tests  for  the  Times  (Dundee,  1845)
Lessons  for  the  Present  from  the  Records  of the  Past  (Edinburgh,  1848)
Preface  to M'Cheyne's  "Expositions of the Epistles to the Seven Churches of Asia"
From  Day to  Day,  a  volume  of  Daily  Readings ; Antiquity  and  Perpetuity  of  the  Sabbath (Stirling,  1856)
Anniversary  Sermon (Glasgow,  1865).

References

Citations

Sources

1813 births
1893 deaths
People from Perth, Scotland
People educated at Perth Academy
Alumni of the University of St Andrews
19th-century Ministers of the Free Church of Scotland